Style Weekly is an online alternative media outlet that was previously an alternative weekly newspaper started in November 1982 for news, arts, culture and opinion in Richmond, Virginia. 

Style was originally owned by Landmark Media Enterprises. In 2018, it was sold to Tribune Publishing along with two other publicans for $34 million. In that same year, Style Weekly was named as the recipient of the Virginia Press Association's award for journalistic integrity and community service.

On May 21, 2021, Tribune Publishing was purchased by hedge fund Alden Global Capital in a $633 million deal.

On September 7, 2021, Style Weekly'''s editor-in-chief announced on Facebook they would be ceasing publication the following day.

On November 17, 2021, VPM Media Corporation, the parent company of public media group VPM, announced it had acquired Style Weekly.

On December 14, 2021, Style Weekly'''s editor-in-chief announced that Style would resume publishing online as it evaluates the future of the print publication.

References

External links 
 

Alternative weekly newspapers published in the United States
Newspapers published in Virginia
Mass media in Richmond, Virginia
Publications with year of establishment missing